The John P. Hussman Institute for Human Genomics (HIHG) is a genome center at the University of Miami's Leonard M. Miller School of Medicine in Miami, Florida.

The institute was established in January 2007 with the goal of discovering genetic influences on human health and applying this knowledge to medical practice. It is listed as one of the top 20 genome centers in the world by DNA sequencing capacity.  It is named after John Hussman, a hedge fund manager.

External links

References

2007 establishments in Florida
Genetics or genomics research institutions
Research institutes in Florida
University of Miami
Research institutes established in 2007